The Northeast Anatolia Region (Turkish: Kuzeydoğu Bölgesi) (TRA) is a statistical region in Turkey.

Subregions and provinces 
 Erzurum Subregion (TRA1)
 Erzurum Province (TRA11)
 Erzincan Province (TRA12)
 Bayburt Province (TRA13)
 Ağrı Subregion (TRA2)
 Ağrı Province (TRA21)
 Kars Province (TRA22)
 Iğdır Province (TRA23)
 Ardahan Province (TRA24)

Age groups

Internal immigration

State register location of Northeast Anatolia residents

Marital status of 15+ population by gender

Education status of 15+ population by gender

See also 
 NUTS of Turkey

References

External links 
 TURKSTAT

Sources 
 ESPON Database

Statistical regions of Turkey